The 2021 season was the Arizona Cardinals' 102nd season in the National Football League (NFL), their 34th in Arizona and their third under head coach Kliff Kingsbury. They improved from their 8–8 season from the previous year with a 23–13 victory over the Seattle Seahawks in Week 11. The Cardinals started 7–0 for the first time in 47 years when they were based in St. Louis. With their week 11 win over their division rivals, the Seattle Seahawks, the Cardinals improved on their record from the previous year and clinched their first winning season since 2015. Despite a loss to the Indianapolis Colts in Week 16, the Cardinals clinched a playoff berth for the first time since 2015 after the Minnesota Vikings lost to the Los Angeles Rams.

Despite an impressive 7–0 start and acquiring All-Pros J. J. Watt and A. J. Green prior to the season starting, the team suffered their second consecutive late-season collapse, only winning four out of their last ten games, resulting in them losing their lead in the division and dropping to the fifth seed. In the Wild Card playoffs, the Cardinals fell to the rival Los Angeles Rams on their way to win Super Bowl LVI.

In the offseason, cornerback Patrick Peterson was lost to free agency after 10 years, and wide receiver Larry Fitzgerald chose not to sign with any team after 17 years with the franchise.

Roster changes

Signings

Trades
March 17: The Cardinals traded a third–round pick in 2021 NFL Draft to the Las Vegas Raiders for C Rodney Hudson.
March 25: The Cardinals traded C Mason Cole to the Minnesota Vikings for a sixth–round pick in the 2021 NFL Draft.
October 15: The Cardinals traded a fifth-round pick in 2022 NFL Draft and CB Tay Gowan to the Philadelphia Eagles for Tight End Zach Ertz.

Draft

Notes

 The Cardinals traded their third-round selection to the Las Vegas Raiders in exchange for the Raiders' seventh-round selection, originally from the Chicago Bears, and center Rodney Hudson.
 The Cardinals traded their 2020 second-round selection, their 2021 fourth-round selection, and running back David Johnson to the Houston Texans in exchange for wide receiver DeAndre Hopkins and the Texans' 2020 fourth-round selection.
The Cardinals traded their fifth-round pick and a 2022 fourth-round selection to the Baltimore Ravens in exchange for a fourth-round pick and a sixth-round pick.
 The Cardinals traded their sixth-round selection to the New York Giants in exchange for linebacker Markus Golden.

Staff

Final roster

Preseason
The Cardinals' preseason schedule was announced on May 12.

Regular season

Schedule
The Cardinals' 2021 schedule was announced on May 12.

Note: Intra-division opponents are in bold text.

Game summaries

Week 1: at Tennessee Titans

Week 2: vs. Minnesota Vikings

Week 3: at Jacksonville Jaguars

The Cardinals earned their first 3–0 start since 2015.

Week 4: at Los Angeles Rams

With the win, the Cardinals not only improved to 4–0 for the first time since 2012, but earned their first victory over the Rams since Week 17 of the 2016 season. Also, with the Broncos, the Raiders, and the Panthers losing their first games of the season, the Cardinals became the last undefeated team in the NFL.

Week 5: vs. San Francisco 49ers

Week 6: at Cleveland Browns

The Cardinals started 6–0 for the first time since 1974.

Week 7: vs. Houston Texans

The Arizona Cardinals played the Houston Texans at home. This was the first game where former Texans DeAndre Hopkins and JJ Watt played against their former team, as well as tight end Zach Ertz's debut with the Cardinals.

Week 8: vs. Green Bay Packers
The Packers handed the Cardinals their first loss to deny them a perfect season with a 24–21 victory on Thursday Night Football, despite entering the game without their top three wide receivers -- Allen Lazard and All-Pro WR Davante Adams missed the game due to COVID protocols, while Marquez Valdes-Scantling was still recovering from a groin injury suffered in Week 3. Kyler Murray had the ball with time winding down, and the ball in field goal range, but a pass intended for wide receiver A. J. Green was picked off in the endzone by Packers cornerback Rasul Douglas, who began the season on the Cardinals practice squad.

Week 9: at San Francisco 49ers

Despite Kyler Murray and DeAndre Hopkins not playing, the Cardinals dominated the game to sweep the season series for the first time since 2018. With the win, the Cardinals improved to 8–1 and tied their 8-win mark from the previous season.

Week 10: vs. Carolina Panthers

Week 11: at Seattle Seahawks
{{Americanfootballbox
|titlestyle=;text-align:center;
|state=autocollapse
|title=Week 11: Arizona Cardinals at Seattle Seahawks – Game summary
|date=November 21
|time=2:25 p.m. MST/1:25 p.m. PST
|road=Cardinals
|R1=7|R2=6|R3=3|R4=7
|home=Seahawks
|H1=0|H2=6|H3=0|H4=7
|stadium=Lumen Field, Seattle, Washington
|attendance=68,833
|weather=Partly cloudy, 
|referee=Clete Blakeman
|TV=Fox
|TVAnnouncers=Kenny Albert, Jonathan Vilma and Sara Walsh
|reference=Recap, Game Book
|scoring=
First quarter
 ARI – Zach Ertz 1-yard pass from Colt McCoy (Matt Prater kick), 2:47. Cardinals 7-0. Drive: 16 plays, 82 yards, 9:27
Second quarter
 SEA – Jason Myers 27-yard field goal, 8:23. Cardinals 7-3. Drive: 7 plays, 36 yards, 2:05. ARI – Zach Ertz 2-yard pass from Colt McCoy (kick failed, wide right), 1:52. Cardinals 13-3. Drive: 13 plays, 92 yards, 6:31
 SEA – Jason Myers 27-yard field goal, 1:05. Cardinals 13-6. Drive: 7 plays, 68 yards, 0:47.Third quarter
 ARI – Matt Prater 53-yard field goal, 12:57. Cardinals 16-6. Drive: 5 plays, 25 yards, 2:03.Fourth quarter
 SEA – DeeJay Dallas 2-yard run (Jason Myers kick), 7:05. Cardinals 16-13. Drive: 5 plays, 74 yards, 1:51 ARI – James Conner 1-yard run (Matt Prater kick), 2:20. Cardinals 23-13. Drive: 10 plays, 67 yards, 4:45|stats=
Top passers
ARI – Colt McCoy – 35/44, 328 yards, 2 TD
SEA – Russell Wilson – 14/26, 207 yards
Top rushers
ARI – James Conner – 21 rushes, 62 yards, TD
SEA – Alex Collins – 10 rushes, 36 yards
Top receivers
ARI – Zach Ertz – 8 receptions, 88 yards, 2 TD
SEA – Tyler Lockett – 4 receptions, 115 yards
}}
With this win the Cardinals improved to 9-2 and secured their first winning season since 2015.

Week 13: at Chicago Bears

Kyler Murray and DeAndre Hopkins returned to the field after the bye and connected for a 21-yard touchdown in the first quarter.

Week 14: vs. Los Angeles Rams

Week 15: at Detroit Lions

Despite the Cardinals being the favorite to win, the 1-11-1 Detroit Lions blew them out 30-12 in an unexpected loss.

The Lions opened the scoring in the first quarter via a 37-yard field goal by Riley Patterson. The Lions scored 14 points in the second quarter via a 37-yard touchdown pass from Jared Goff to Amon-Ra St. Brown and a 22-yard touchdown pass from Goff to Josh Reynolds, which made the score 17–0 in favor of Detroit at half-time. The Cardinals finally got on the board in the third quarter via a 29-yard field goal by Matt Prater. The Lions extended their lead via a six-yard touchdown pass from Goff to Jason Cabinda. The Cardinals responded with a 29-yard field goal by Prater. The Lions extended their lead in the fourth quarter via a 47-yard field goal by Patterson. The Cardinals responded with a 26-yard touchdown pass from Kyler Murray to Christian Kirk. The Lions scored the final points of the game via a 45-yard field goal by Patterson, making the final score 30–12 in favor of Detroit.

With the loss, Arizona fell to 10-4, marking their only road game loss in 2021.

Week 16: vs. Indianapolis Colts
NFL on Christmas Day

Week 17: at Dallas Cowboys

With the win, the Cardinals finished a league-best 8–1 on the road.

Week 18: vs. Seattle Seahawks

With the loss, the Cardinals finished the season 11–6, earning a Wildcard spot in the 2021–22 NFL playoffs as the 5th seed.

Standings
Division

Conference

Postseason

Game summaries
NFC Wild Card Playoffs: at (4) Los Angeles Rams

Statistics

Team

IndividualStatistics correct as of the end of the 2021 NFL season''

References

External links
 

Arizona
Arizona Cardinals seasons
Arizona Cardinals